Ryan Birch (5 April 1969 – 19 March 2013) was a British judoka, representing Great Britain in two Olympic Games.

Biography
Birch was born in Kingston upon Hull. In 1991, he won the first of his two championships of Great Britain, winning the half-middleweight division at the British Judo Championships. The following year he was slected by Great Britain for the 1992 Summer Olympics in Barcelona, where he competed in the men's 78 kg event. 

In 1994, he won the gold medal at the 1994 European Judo Championships in Gdańsk, Poland. In 1996, he was selected to represent Great Briatin at the 1996 Summer Olympics in Atlanta, Georgia, where he competed in the men's 86 kg event.

In 1998, he became a champion of Great Britain for the second time after winning the title at the heavier weight class of middleweight.

He married Rowena Sweatman (who also won the European judo gold medal in 1994) and had two children. On retiring from sport, he went on to become a pilot.He was killed in a road accident in The Bahamas.

Achievements

References

External links
 
 Ryan Birch's obituary
 The British Judo Association Reports

1969 births
Sportspeople from Kingston upon Hull
2013 deaths
British male judoka
Judoka at the 1992 Summer Olympics
Judoka at the 1996 Summer Olympics
Olympic judoka of Great Britain
Road incident deaths in the Bahamas